Arto Tiainen (5 September 1930 – 21 September 1998) was a Finnish cross-country skier. He was born in Sääminki.

Champion
He won two medals at the 1964 Winter Olympics, a silver in the 4 × 10 km relay and a bronze in the 50 km. Additionally, Tianen won two medals at the FIS Nordic World Ski Championships, a silver in 50 km (1966) and a bronze in the 4 × 10 km relay (1958).

Award
Tianen's biggest cross-country skiing success came at the Holmenkollen ski festival, where he won the 50 km event in both 1964 and 1965. For his successes, Tiainen earned the Holmenkollen medal in 1965 (Shared with Bengt Eriksson and Arne Larsen).

Politics
Arto Tiainen was a Social Democratic member of the Finnish Parliament from 22 January 1970 to 22 March 1970.

Cross-country skiing results
All results are sourced from the International Ski Federation (FIS).

Olympic Games
 2 medals – (1 silver, 1 bronze)

World Championships
 2 medals – (1 silver, 1 bronze)

References

External links

 - click Holmenkollmedaljen for downloadable pdf file 
 - click Vinnere for downloadable pdf file 

1930 births
1998 deaths
People from Savonlinna
Social Democratic Party of Finland politicians
Members of the Parliament of Finland (1966–70)
Cross-country skiers at the 1956 Winter Olympics
Cross-country skiers at the 1960 Winter Olympics
Cross-country skiers at the 1964 Winter Olympics
Cross-country skiers at the 1968 Winter Olympics
Holmenkollen medalists
Holmenkollen Ski Festival winners
Finnish male cross-country skiers
Olympic cross-country skiers of Finland
Olympic medalists in cross-country skiing
FIS Nordic World Ski Championships medalists in cross-country skiing
Medalists at the 1964 Winter Olympics
Olympic silver medalists for Finland
Olympic bronze medalists for Finland
20th-century Finnish people